Ernest Francis Fortney (January 6, 1915 – October 11, 1987) was an American professional basketball player. He played in college for Duquesne University. Fortney then played in the National Basketball League for the Pittsburgh Pirates and Youngstown Bears where he averaged 3.1 points per game in his career.

References

1915 births
1987 deaths
American men's basketball players
Basketball players from Pittsburgh
Centers (basketball)
Duquesne Dukes men's basketball players
Pittsburgh Pirates (NBL) players
Youngstown Bears players